Ruben Tovmasyan (February 15, 1937 – March 30, 2019) was the General Secretary of the Armenian Communist Party.

Biography

In 1977, Tovmasyan graduated from the Armenian State University of Economics. From 1977 to 1989, he was the first secretary of the Orkhanikidze and Shahumian regional committees of the Communist Party of Armenia and the central office of the Communist Party. From 1989 to 1990, he was head of the Refugee Reception and Hosting Department. From 1991 until 1993, Tovmasyan was a member of the Transport and Communication Division of the Council of Ministers of Armenia. From 2000 to 2003, he was Secretary of the CPA Central Committee. In 2003, he was made First Secretary. Tovmasyan resigned from his position in 2013 for personal reasons.

References

External links
Freedom of information blacklist 2006
Armenia update

1937 births
2019 deaths
Armenian Communist Party politicians
Armenian State University of Economics alumni
Communist Party of Armenia (Soviet Union) politicians